San Carlo is a Baroque-style, former Roman Catholic church in Modena, Italy. It has been deconsecrated and is used as an auditorium.

History
Construction of the present church began in 1664 using designs of Bartolomeo Avanzini. The apse has a large painting San Carlo Borromeo among the people of Milan afflicted by the plague of 1576 by Marcantonio Franceschini.

References

Roman Catholic churches in Modena
Baroque architecture in Modena
17th-century Roman Catholic church buildings in Italy
1664 establishments in Italy